Judge Sheridan may refer to:

Michael Henry Sheridan (1912–1976), judge of the United States District Court for the Middle District of Pennsylvania
Peter G. Sheridan (born 1950), judge of the United States District Court for the District of New Jersey